Lo frate 'nnamorato  (Neapolitan: The Brother in Love) is a three-act commedia per musica (a form of opera buffa) by Giovanni Battista Pergolesi, to a Neapolitan libretto by Gennaro Antonio Federico, first performed in 1732.

Composition history
The opera, written when the composer was only 22, is his first attempt at comic opera. (It was followed in 1733 by his better-known short opera, La serva padrona). The first performance was on 27 September 1732, at the Teatro dei Fiorentini, Naples. A successful run was halted by a severe earthquake, which closed the theatres in Naples until the autumn of 1733. It was re-presented during the 1734 carnival season, in a version revised by the author.

Roles

At this time in history, when comic opera was in its infancy, librettists wrote works with both comic and serious characters.

Synopsis
Setting: House of Marcaniello; Capodimonte region of Naples

Ascanio, the brother of Nina and Nena, was stolen by brigands in childhood and presumed lost; he was, however, found and adopted by Marcaniello.

Now, Nina and Nena are the wards of their uncle, the Roman Don Carlo. Don Carlo wishes to marry Luggrezia, the daughter of Marcaniello, who himself wishes to marry Nina and to take Nena as a wife for his son, the foppish Don Pietro. Nina and Nena meanwhile have fallen in love with Ascanio, not realizing their relationship. The two maids Vanella (servant of Carlo) and Cardella (servant of Marcaniello) comment on and take part in the various intrigues which ensue.

Finally, in a duel with Carlo, the latter recognizes Ascanio as his lost nephew by a birthmark on his arm. Ascanio and Luggrezia are now free to marry.

Orchestration 
 Continuo
 Flute/Oboe (flautist would play oboe in some numbers)
 Strings

Recordings
key: conductor/Nena/Nina/Luggrezia/Ascanio/Carlo/Marcaniello/Pietro/Cardella/Vannella
Cillario/Girones/Cavicchioli/Cavicchioli/Bonisolli/Lazzari/Mariotti/Basiola/Taylor Bonisolli/Fusco - 1969, live in Naples - Memories
Fabio Biondi/Biccirè/Adamonyte/di Castri/Belfiore/Alegret/Alaimo-N/Morace/Bove/Chierici - 2011, filmed in Jesi - Arthaus DVD
Riccardo Muti/Felle/Manca di Nissa/D’Intino/Focile/di Cesare/Corbelli/de Simone/Curiel/Norberg-Schulz - 1989, filmed at Teatro alla Scala in Milan - Opus Arte DVD

Notes

References
  Raffaele Mellace, Frate 'nnamorato, Lo, in Piero Gelli and Filippo Poletti (editors), Dizionario dell'opera 2008, Milan, Baldini Castoldi Dalai, 2007, pp. 520–523,  (reproduced at Opera Manager)

External links
  Ogni pena più spietata (aria from Act 1 of the opera) sung by Janet Baker.

Operas
Opera buffa
1732 operas
Italian-language operas
Operas set in Italy
Operas by Giovanni Battista Pergolesi